Lumbini Provincial Hospital is a government hospital located in Butwal in Lumbini Province of Nepal. The hospital is considered a crucial resource for healthcare to poor citizens who cannot afford private hospitals.

History 
This small dispensary was upgraded with time.

The bed number was later increased to 200 to meet the demand of local people served by 29 doctors, 31 nurses giving service to 19 people per day on average.

References 

Hospitals in Nepal
1910s establishments in Nepal